Godrej & Boyce Mfg. Co. Ltd. (G&B) is the flagship company of the Godrej Group. Established in 1897 in Mumbai, India, G&B is a privately held company with a presence across 10 industries – from building complex and custom engineering solutions for critical industries like aerospace, defence, clean energy, railways and automotive to manufacturing branded goods.

Headquartered in Pirojshanagar at Vikhroli, Mumbai, India, Godrej and Boyce also offers products in Europe, U.S., Middle East, Africa and South East Asia.

Mr. Jamshyd Godrej is the company's chairman and managing director.

History 
Godrej & Boyce's (G&B) was founded in 1897. G&B's story began as part of India's Swadeshi movement – the original 'Make in India' movement. Founded by Ardeshir Godrej (1868–1936), a serial innovator and inventor along with his brother Pirojsha Burjorji Godrej, who focused on manufacturing.  They patented the world's first springless lock, built the first indigenously manufactured fire and burglar resistant safe in India, and later invented a process to make soap from vegetable oil.

Pirojsha's son Naval Godrej laid the foundation for the urban township of Pirojshanagar in Vikhroli, Mumbai,  where the company's global headquarters and key operations are located today.

In Business Today B.K. Karanjia, in his book, Godrej: A Hundred Years, quotes a testimonial: A survivor of another fire in 1914 says of the family safe: "Being Godrej's, we were confident the papers [inside] would be found intact, but some of us had doubts about the safety of the pearls. On opening the safe, we were all agreeably surprised to see that the pearls were perfectly safe and as lustrous as before the fire." Even King George V and Queen Mary used a Godrej safe to store valuables on their 1911 India visit for the Delhi durbar.

Sustainability 
Godrej & Boyce aims to generate over 1/3rd of its overall revenues from environment friendly products. Apart from this, G&B has supported a skilling initiative called Disha for more than ten years. As a part of its Good & Green strategy, the company focuses on three pillars:

 Ensuring employability 
 Building a greener India 
 Innovating for Good & Green Products

Godrej & Boyce Business Units 

 Godrej Aerospace
 Godrej Appliances
 Godrej Construction
 Godrej Electrical & Electronics
 Godrej Interio
 Godrej Locking Solutions & Systems
 Godrej Lawkim Motors
 Godrej Material Handling
 Godrej Precision Engineering
 Godrej Process Equipment
 Godrej Security Solutions
 Godrej Storage Solutions
 Godrej Tooling
 Godrej Vending
 Godrej Koerber
 Godrej Infotech

Major subsidiaries and affiliates
 Godrej Infotech Ltd.
 Godrej Korber
 Veromatic International B.V.
 Godrej (Singapore) Pte. Ltd.
 Godrej (Vietnam) Co. Ltd.
 Godrej & Khimji (Middle East) LLC.
 Godrej Americas Inc.

References

Manufacturing companies based in Mumbai
Aircraft engine manufacturers of India
Gas turbine manufacturers
Aerospace companies of India
Rocket engine manufacturers of India
Godrej Group
Indian brands
Indian private spaceflight companies
Indian companies established in 1897
Manufacturing companies established in 1897
Home appliance manufacturers of India